Immortal Beloved is an audio drama based on the long-running British science fiction television series Doctor Who. This audio drama was produced by Big Finish Productions and was broadcast on BBC 7 on 21 January 2007.

Plot
The Doctor and Lucie Miller land the TARDIS next to a cliff in what appears to be ancient Greece. Two star-crossed lovers, Kalkin and Sararti, have been preparing to kill themselves nearby, but the Doctor and Lucie prevent this, and soon anachronistic helicopters surround them all. One of the soldiers who disembark, General Ares, is gravely injured in the ensuing struggle. The Doctor just about saves his life and he, Lucie, Sararti and Kalkin are taken back to a grand palace, where to their horror they witness the ailing Ares' mind being transferred into the body of another man, one of the soldiers, who has expected this and is entirely willing to so sacrifice himself to his 'destiny'. The Doctor confronts Zeus, the autocratic ruler of this strange society where guns are labelled as magic wands and the hi-tech mind-transfer device is an 'incarnation chamber'. Zeus admits that he is not really a god, and reveals that they are on a lost Earth colony planet in Lucie's distant future. Generations ago, he and his wife Hera, along with many others, some now long gone, landed here and he has gone on to create a society based upon Greek myth. He explains that he was the pilot of the original colony ship, and Kalkin is not his son, but his next-in-line clone, who has rebelled against his fate. The next clone after that, Ganymede, is by contrast committed to his cruel destiny, but is too young for a transfer. The ruling class, the remains of the original crew – the 'gods' – use their machine, which the Doctor insists has long been outlawed as an abomination – to transfer their minds periodically into their clones, giving them practical immortality. Zeus has appeared welcoming, but lusts after Lucie despite insisting that he and Hera have a thousand-year-old love. He reveals himself to be a madman, and demands that the Doctor use the TARDIS to fetch parts to repair the immortality machine, as it has become worn out and they are now without space-travel capabilities. The Doctor very reluctantly agrees after Zeus threatens to hurt Lucie – even to clone her repeatedly and torture each Lucie to death for all eternity. When Hera suffers a heart attack, her mind transfer into the unwilling Sararti fails, leaving Sararti in control of her body. Pretending all is well, she suddenly stabs Zeus, so that he requires an immediate transfer into Kalkin's body. The Doctor appears to go along with this under pressure from Ares and the loyal soldiers, but ensures that it fails. Though Lucie and Sararti at first fail to appreciate this ruse, the Doctor and the new Zeus – Kalkin, of course – convince them that the lovers can secretly take on his and Hera's roles. They insist that they will stop using the machine as the Doctor and Lucie take their leave. Lucie is optimistic, but the Doctor reminds her that these two are essentially younger versions of the tyrannical pair they have helped to overthrow...

Cast
The Doctor — Paul McGann
Lucie Miller — Sheridan Smith
Zeus — Ian McNeice
Hera — Elspet Gray
Kalkin — Anthony Spargo
Sararti — Jennifer Higham
Tayden/Ares — David Dobson
Ganymede — Jake McGann

Production and casting
Ian McNeice would later play Winston Churchill in the revived series episodes "The Beast Below", "Victory of the Daleks" and "The Pandorica Opens" in 2010, and "The Wedding of River Song" in 2011. He also went on to star in The Renaissance Man in 2012.

Influences

Immortal Beloved has clearly been inspired by Roger Zelazny's Hugo Award-winning novel Lord of Light. The crew of a generational spaceship posing as gods using high-tech science masquerading as god-like powers and maintaining 'immortality' by migrating minds between bodies. By way of homage, the name of the character Kalkin is a reference to one of the names given to the central protagonist in Zelazny's novel.

Trivia
Elspet Gray previously appeared in the Doctor Who television story Arc of Infinity as Time Lady Thalia.
Jake McGann (Ganymede) is Paul McGann's son, and this was his first acting role. He returns in An Earthly Child and Relative Dimensions, where he plays Alex Campbell, Susan's son and the Doctor's great grandson.
Paul McGann, Sheridan Smith and Ian McNeice would all later appear together again in the Jonathan Creek episode "The Judas Tree".

References

External links
Big Finish Productions – Immortal Beloved

2007 audio plays
Eighth Doctor audio plays
Radio plays based on Doctor Who
2007 radio dramas
Classical mythology in popular culture
Cloning in fiction